Henge (stylised as HENGE) are a British concept band formed in Manchester in 2015  The band play a type of electronic crossover rock which they call Cosmic Dross whilst performing as the fictional characters Zpor, Goo, Grok and Nom.

Members

Matthew Whitaker (performing as Zpor) – vocals and guitar
Pete Turner (performing as Goo) – bass guitar and synth bass
Roy Medhurst (performing as Grok) – synthesizers
Sam Draper (performing as Nom) – drums

Career

Henge's first release was a five track EP in July 2017, entitled Cosmic Dross. It was released on Love Love Records and, according to their agent's page, is "a five track EP of electronic madness so unique and captivating that it firmly cemented their reputation with the alternative festival community".

Henge released their debut album, Attention Earth! (stylised in all capitals), on 19 October 2018.

Discography

Singles and EPs

Albums

Other Projects 

Starting in 2019 the band collaborated with artists Tom Eglington and Boo Cook of British comic book 2000AD and Phil Buckingham to produce a series of comics about the band. Comic #1 was released in September 2019 followed by #2 in September 2021.

Tours 

 Attention Earth! Tour (2018)
 Demilitarise Tour (2019)
 The Cosmic Dross Experiment (2019)
 Earth Garden, Malta (2022)
 Wanderlust Tour (2022)

Awards 

The Limerick Post reported that they were voted "Best live act of 2018", in the lead up to their appearance at the Limrock Festival in Limerick, Ireland, held in April 2019. The award was won at the 2018 Independent Festival Awards.

In 2022 Henge were awarded silver in the Best Music Video category by the Tokyo Film Awards for the video to the single New Planet

References

External links
 

English electronic music groups
Musical groups from Manchester